Abdullahi Haji Hassan Mohamed Nuur is a Somali politician. He served as Somalia's Minister of Agriculture and Livestock and later also as Foreign Minister.

Overview
Nuur hails from the Leysan subdivision of the Rahaweyn (Mirifle) clan. Prior to his entry into Somali politics, he was part of the Somali diaspora in Canada.

In August 2011, Nuur was appointed as Somalia's new Minister of Agriculture and Livestock by then Prime Minister, Abdiweli Mohamed Ali.

Following a Cabinet reshuffle in February 2012, Nuur was given the Foreign Minister portfolio.

References

Living people
Year of birth missing (living people)
Foreign Ministers of Somalia
Government ministers of Somalia